Oldman may refer to:

People
Oldman (king) (died 1687), King of the Miskito Nation
Albert Oldman (1883–1961), British boxer
C. B. Oldman (1894–1969), English bibliographer
Gary Oldman (born 1958), British actor
Hugh Oldman (1914–1988), British soldier and cricketer
Kurt Oldman, Swiss-born composer
Mark Oldman (born 1969), American entrepreneur
Maureen Oldman, known as Laila Morse, (born 1945), British actress
Richard Oldman (1877–1943), British Army officer
William Ockelford Oldman (1879–1949), ethnographic collector and dealer

Places

Oldman Formation, Alberta, Canada
Oldman Lake, Montana, United States
Oldman River, Alberta, Canada
Oldman River valley parks system, Alberta, Canada
Oldman Wood, Scotland, United Kingdom

Other uses
Old man (disambiguation)
Coyote Oldman, American band
Old-man cactus, plant
Oldman klipfish
Oldman wormwood, flowering plant
Old Man of the Mountain, a former rock formation in New Hampshire

Disambiguation pages with surname-holder lists